Paul Norman Hug (June 27, 1906 – September 5, 1949)  was an American college football player and coach.

Early years
Hug played under LeRoy Sprankle at Kingsport High with Bobby Dodd. Both Hug and Dodd intended to attend Vanderbilt University but were pried away by Robert Neyland.

University of Tennessee
Hug was a prominent end for the Tennessee Volunteers football teams of the University of Tennessee from 1928 to 1930.

1928
In 1928, Tennessee remained undefeated on the season with a 6–0 victory over Vanderbilt; its first win in the series since 1916.  Before 1928, Vanderbilt held a strong advantage over the Volunteers with a record of 18–2–3.  Since 1928, Tennessee has dominated the rivalry. The crowd of 22,000 was the largest ever to see a game in Tennessee up to that point. A 16-yard pass from Roy Witt to Paul Hug in the second quarter was the lone score of the contest. He wore number 26 and weighed 172 pounds.

1929
Hug was selected All-Southern in 1929.

Coaching career
Hugh was an assistant at Southwestern University—now known as Rhodes College—and a head coach the University of Tennessee Junior College—now known as University of Tennessee at Martin. At the latter institution, he is the namesake of Hug Drive.

References

1906 births
1949 deaths
American football ends
Rhodes Lynx football coaches
Tennessee Volunteers football players
UT Martin Skyhawks football coaches
All-Southern college football players
People from Kingsport, Tennessee
Players of American football from Tennessee